The 2002 Australian Grand Prix (formally the 2002 Foster's Australian Grand Prix) was a Formula One motor race held on 3 March 2002 at the Melbourne Grand Prix Circuit, Albert Park, Melbourne, Victoria, Australia. With 127,000 people in attendance, the race was the first of the 2002 Formula One World Championship and the 18th Australian Grand Prix in Formula One. Ferrari driver Michael Schumacher won the 58-lap race starting from second position. Juan Pablo Montoya of Williams finished second and Kimi Räikkönen took third for the McLaren team, his first podium finish.

Ferrari's Rubens Barrichello qualified on pole position by recording the fastest lap in qualifying. He retired at the start of the race, when he braked early for the first corner, catching out Williams driver Ralf Schumacher, who hit the rear of Barrichello's car. Six drivers were involved in a separate incident. The safety car was deployed for four laps to clear the track. McLaren's David Coulthard led the first ten laps until an error on lap eleven allowed Michael Schumacher to pass him. Montoya then passed Schumacher for first place at the beginning of lap twelve. He kept the lead until he ran wide and Michael Schumacher overtook him to reclaim it. He led the rest of the race to take the 54th win of his career.

Following this, the first round of the season, Michael Schumacher left Australia leading the World Drivers' Championship with ten points. Montoya was four points behind in second with Räikkönen third. In the Constructors' Championship, Ferrari led with ten points followed by Williams and McLaren with sixteen races left in the season.

Background

Preparations for the event began in January 2002. At the time, it was only on the provisional calendar of the 2002 Formula One World Championship due to the death of marshal Graham Beveridge in an accident in the 2001 race. Formula One's governing body, the Fédération Internationale de l'Automobile (FIA), later confirmed it would proceed as scheduled following the publication of a coroner's report ruling Beveridge's death "avoidable". It was the first of 17 races of 2002 and the 18th Formula One World Championship Australian race. It occurred at the  Melbourne Grand Prix Circuit in the Melbourne suburb of Albert Park in Victoria on 3 March.

Heading into the new season, several teams retained the same line-up as they had in 2001, however some teams changed drivers for 2002. The Benetton team was renamed Renault, ending its 16-year involvement in Formula One, and the Japanese car maker Toyota debuted with drivers Allan McNish and Mika Salo after it spent 2001 developing the TF102. The Prost team was liquidated in January 2002 after it was unable to locate money from sponsors or a buyer to remain solvent. The two-time world champion Mika Häkkinen took a sabbatical and fellow Finn Kimi Räikkönen replaced him at McLaren, whose Sauber car was driven by Felipe Massa, the 2001 Euro Formula 3000 champion. At the Jordan team, the 2001 British Formula Three champion Takuma Sato paired with Giancarlo Fisichella, whom Jarno Trulli replaced at Renault. Former Prost driver Heinz-Harald Frentzen drove Jos Verstappen's Arrows car, and Fernando Alonso left Minardi to become Renault's test driver; he was replaced by International Formula 3000 competitor Mark Webber.

At the front of the field, the press and bookmakers considered Ferrari's Michael Schumacher the favourite to take his fifth World Drivers' Championship, with the Williams driver Juan Pablo Montoya predicted to be his main challenger. Schumacher said his objective for the season was to win the championship and equal Juan Manuel Fangio's all-time record of five titles, "Our motivation is still unchanged, our target and goals are still the same. We want to once again win both world championships and there is nothing nicer than winning with Ferrari." Montoya declared that he was more relaxed than he was in 2001 because he knew his team better, "I think I showed everyone out there that I am competitive and that's the important thing. It was a lot harder to win in Formula One than in CART because it took longer to understand the car, but now that's done I'm looking to do better in 2002." Former driver Derek Warwick believed Michael Schumacher was the best driver in the sport and suspected Montoya was not emotionally mature.

Ferrari brought the F2001 in lieu of the F2002 to Australia due to performance and reliability issues. According to the Ferrari team principal Jean Todt, the F2002 was fast in pre-season testing but the team had not the time available to be certain that it would be reliable in Australia, "We think it will be able to bring home valuable points for the championship. Next week, we will continue our on-track development of the F2002, as well as fine-tuning the F2001 for the first race." During the first two practice sessions, the F2001 was fitted with a rear wing used on the F2002 in testing; both Michael Schumacher and his teammate Rubens Barrichello opted for one seen at the 2001 Japanese Grand Prix. The McLaren MP4-17 car featured an attachment to its lower front suspension frame split to promote airflow under the front wing, and revised ailerons were equipped to the front and rear of the car. The Jordan, Arrows and Sauber teams copied the design.

Practice
There were four practice sessions preceding Sunday's race, two one-hour sessions on Friday and two 45-minute sessions on Saturday. In the first session, which was held in variable weather leading to the fastest times late on, Michael Schumacher lapped fastest at 1 minute, 28.804 seconds, 0.363 seconds faster than his teammate Barrichello in second. Fisichella, Ralf Schumacher, Massa, the Jaguar duo of Pedro de la Rosa and Eddie Irvine, Frentzen, Salo and Renault's Jenson Button foallowed in third through tenth.

Michael Schumacher set the day's fastest lap, a 1-minute, 27.276 seconds, in the second session. His teammate Barrichello was 0.523 seconds slower in second. The two Williams cars of Ralf Schumacher and Montoya, Nick Heidfeld of the Sauber team, Salo, Räikkönen, Massa, Fisichella and Trulli were in positions three to ten. During the session, Enrique Bernoldi stopped his Arrows A23 car with a broken gearbox. Barrichello spun through 360 degrees across the grass and reemerged onto the circuit soon after. Montoya braked too late and returned to the track via an escape road and a gravel trap. A short light rain shower made the circuit slippery and caught out Alex Yoong; he beached his Minardi car in the turn one gravel trap. An engine failure ended Fisichella's session early and his teammate Sato ran across a gravel trap.

The weather for the third session was cool, damp and overcast. Ferrari continued to be fastest with a revised unofficial lap record of 1 minute, 26.177 seconds from Michael Schumacher. Barrichello was 0.321 seconds slower in second. McLaren's Coulthard and Räikkönen, Williams' Ralf Schumacher and Montoya, British American Racing (BAR) driver Olivier Panis, Sauber teammates Heidfeld and Massa along with Trulli followed in the top ten. Sato was unhurt; practice was stopped for nine minutes to allow marshals to clean the track. Since spare cars could not be used in free practice, Sato missed the fourth session since his car required repairs.

In the fourth session, a brief rain shower dampened the circuit, which prevented an improvement in lap times as some drivers went off the track. Hence, no driver bettered Michael Schumacher's fastest time, as Barrichello in second halved the gap to his teammate. The Williams duo of Montoya and Ralf Schumacher improved to third and fourth and the McLaren pair of Coulthard and Räikkönen fell to fifth and sixth. Heidfeld, the BAR duo of Jacques Villeneuve and Panis and Fisichella were seventh to tenth.

Qualifying

Saturday's afternoon one-hour qualifying session saw each competitor limited to twelve laps, with the starting order decided by their fastest laps. During this session, the 107% rule was in effect, which necessitated each driver set a time within 107 per cent of the quickest lap to qualify for the race. The session began on a dry track until a heavy rainstorm fell halfway through, making the circuit slippery and prevented any improvement in lap time. Barrichello completed two laps before it rained (the first was compromised by slower traffic); he took the fourth pole position of his career and his first since the 2000 British Grand Prix with a time of 1 minute, 25.843 seconds. He was joined on the grid's front row by Michael Schumacher, who made an error on a kerb in the first third of a lap. Ralf Schumacher, third, remained in the garage for the first three minutes to avoid slower traffic. Fourth-placed Coulthard attempted to pass an unsighted Villeneuve on the outside at the final turn and they made contact. Coulthard hit the wall with his right-rear wheel and spun onto a run-off area. An error put his teammate Räikkönen fifth. Montoya in sixth lost six-tenths of a second after Fisichella slowed his first timed lap. Trulli in seventh was slowed by a Jaguar car on his first lap. Fisichella in eighth expressed satisfaction with the balance and performance of his car. Massa was the highest-placed rookie in ninth after two errors. His teammate Heidfeld qualified tenth.

Button was the fastest driver not to qualify in the top ten after he was fourth early on. Panis completed one timed lap as he could not extract more performance from his BAR 004 and took 12th. Excess oversteer slowed his teammate Villeneuve in 13th. Salo, 14th, drove cautiously on his first timed lap. A minor fuel pressure fault limited Frentzen in 15th to one untroubled lap. McNish, 16th, had one set of tyres deducted from his qualifying allocation because Toyota mistakenly used one set assigned for the Friday practice sessions on Saturday. A stoppage caught out Bernoldi at the start of his first timed lap and he qualified 17th. Webber took 18th and used wet-weather tyres. The two Jaguar R3 cars had a major aerodynamic deficiency and were 19th and 20th: A rear brake balance slowed Irvine and a handling deficiency saw de la Rosa drive the spare Jaguar. Yoong completed one timed lap for 21st. Five minutes in Sato's spare Jordan EJ12 car stopped before Stewart turn with a hydraulic clutch problem that automatically selected third gear. The session was stopped for eight minutes to allow marshals to move his car. Sato returned to his garage and drove Fisichella's race car but the rain made him more than 107 per cent slower than Barrichello.

Post-qualifying 
After qualifying, the Jordan team principal and owner Eddie Jordan appealed to the stewards to allow Sato to participate in the race because he was under the 107 per cent limit during free practice. They permitted him to start under "exceptional circumstances" as in the case of previous cases affected by changeable weather.

Qualifying classification

Notes
  – Takuma Sato set a time 107% slower than the fastest qualifying lap. He was granted permission from the stewards to start the race due to "exceptional circumstances".

Warm-up

A half-hour warm-up session was held on Sunday morning in variable weather as heavy rain fell before it commenced. Teams used rain tyres and set-up their cars against the weather of the time. With a lap of 1 minute and 41.509 seconds, Michael Schumacher was fastest with teammate Barrichello 1.382 seconds slower in second position. Coulthard, Ralf Schumacher, Montoya, Massa, Heidfeld, Fisichella, Trulli and Irvine made up positions three to ten. With 40 seconds to go, Salo drove off the racing line to allow Barrichello past into Ascari corner. He drove onto a white painted line, lost control of his Toyota and crashed into the barrier; Salo's front wing detached heading towards an escape road.

Race
A total of 127,000 people attended the event. Sato drove the spare Jordan EJ12 car set up for his teammate Fisichella; after warm-up the Jordan team rectified an electrical problem that rendered its clutch inoperable.

Ralf Schumacher used the grip on the outside to pass Michael Schumacher for second position and challenged the heavily fuelled Ferrari of Barrichello for the lead. As Michael Schumacher turned left to provide himself with the best possible entry for Brabham corner, his teammate Barrichello switched lanes twice to try to block Ralf Schumacher, who responded by turning to the centre in anticipation momentum would give him the lead. He launched over the Ferrari, grazed Barrichello's helmet, careened  and rested against the tyre wall in the run-off area upright. Barrichello's rear wing was removed from his car, spinning broadside to a stop and caused an eight-car accident. His teammate Michael Schumacher and Räikkönen drove onto the grass to avoid a collision, as Fisichella hit the Sauber cars of Heidfeld and Massa, causing Button, Panis and McNish to get caught up in the incident. Villeneuve, Salo, Webber, Irvine, de la Rosa, Yoong and Sato weaved through the crash scene. Barrichello and Ralf Schumacher were unhurt.

The drivers involved in the crash returned to the pit lane in anticipation that the race would be stopped and could drive their spare cars for a restart. However, the FIA race director, Charlie Whiting, did not stop the race and order a restart. He deployed the safety car with the damaged cars moved and debris cleared. This left Coulthard in the lead, followed by Trulli, Montoya, Michael Schumacher, Irvine and de la Rosa. At lap two's conclusion, Räikkönen entered the pit lane for a 48-second pit stop for a new front wing and to remove debris lodged behind his back. Webber's differential and traction control began to malfunction on lap three. On the same lap, Frentzen ignored a red light instructing drivers to remain in the pit lane until further notice and entered the circuit. The safety car was withdrawn at the fifth lap's conclusion and Coulthard led Trulli and Montoya. Going into Whiteford turn, Montoya drew close to Trulli and slid wide on oil laid on the circuit. This meant Michael Schumacher overtook Montoya for third place. Further back, Räikkönen moved from eleventh to ninth position.

Coulthard began to pull away from the rest of the field, increasing his lead to four-and-a-half seconds by lap seven. That same lap, Sato overtook de la Rosa for sixth place, as Webber lost seventh position to Räikkönen. At the back, Bernoldi rejoined the race after switching from his race car to the spare Arrows vehicle. Trulli blocked Michael Schumacher from passing him for second into Brabham corner on the eighth lap, allowing Montoya to gain on Schumacher; he was not close enough to affect a pass. There were overtakes further down the field: Räikkönen passed de la Rosa and Sato as Villeneuve overtook Webber for ninth. During lap nine, Trulli lost control of the rear of his Renault on oil at the exit to Jones turn, and broke his suspension in a collision with the inside barrier. Because Trulli was stopped on the centre of the track, the safety car was deployed for the second time to allow marshals to move his car. When the safety car was withdrawn at the end of the 11th lap, an electrical fault distracted Coulthard, causing him to miss a gear change, lock his brakes, and understeer wide onto the grass entering Prost turn. He fell to fifth.

Michael Schumacher took the lead with Montoya second and Irvine third. Approaching Brabham corner Montoya's higher straightline speed allowed him to overtake Michael Schumacher on the outside at the end of the main straight for the lead. Montoya then steered onto the inside to maintain the lead from Schumacher at Jones corner. By the 13th lap, Michael Schumacher had closed to within eight-tenths of a second to affect a pass on Montoya, which he was unable to do due to slower traffic. On lap 14, Sato retired in the pit lane with an unrectifiable electronics issue limiting his gear selection. Michael Schumacher continued to pressure Montoya into an error, and caused the latter to drive onto oil at Brabham corner. He overtook Montoya on the inside at the exit of Jones turn to take the lead at the start of lap 17. Michael Schumacher began to pull away from the rest of the field as Montoya struggled to generate heat in his tyres. On lap 18, de la Rosa fell to eighth after Yoong, Webber and Villeneuve overtook him. On the following lap Frentzen was disqualified for his earlier transgression of ignoring the red light at the exit of the pit lane.

By the 22nd lap Michael Schumacher increased his lead over Montoya to 11.3 seconds with consecutive lap times in the 1 minute, 29 second range. Räikkönen was eight-tenths of a second behind Montoya. On the same lap, Coulthard went off the track at Prost corner. His reduced speed promoted Irvine to fourth soon after. On lap 23 Bernoldi was disqualified from the race because the stewards deemed him to have switched to the spare car after the race began. Webber and Villeneuve passed Coulthard for fifth and sixth on laps 25 and 26. Villeneuve in sixth had a rear wing failure that sent him into the tyre wall at high speed on the entry to Waite corner and retirement from his 100th race entry on lap 28. He was unhurt. On lap 29, Yoong overtook Coulthard for sixth position. Seven laps later, Coulthard became the race's final retirement when he pulled off to the side of track at Whiteford corner because his McLaren was stuck in sixth gear.

Webber was the first of the top six drivers to make a pit stop on lap 37. He had a problematic 34.9-second pit stop; the Minardi's fuel cover did not open automatically and a mechanic used a screwdriver to unsecure it. Webber rejoined the track in sixth position. Montoya and Michael Schumacher made their pit stops on laps 37 and 38. In the meantime, Räikkönen recorded the race's fastest lap of 1 minute, 25.841 seconds on lap 37, as he sought to pass Montoya for second position after his pit stop. He made his stop on lap 38. As Räikkönen drove onto the track, he drew alongside Montoya and carried excess speed into Brabham corner. He understeered wide onto the grass as he regained control of the rear of his car and fell to third, behind Montoya.

With the first four positions settled, attention switched to the battle for fifth between Webber and Salo. Webber short shifted to prevent unneeded car component stress and noticed Salo closing up. He went faster and the Minardi team owner Paul Stoddart radioed that he had to defend fifth from Salo, with Webber aware of a potential revenue bonus of $25 million for Minardi for finishing ahead of Toyota in the World Constructors' Championship. Salo had been aware of the distance between himself and Webber and closed up to the latter by the 57th lap. He attempted to pass Webber; the aerodynamic turbulence created by airflow over Webber's car and the latter's block meant Salo spun through 180 degrees on radiator coolant from Button's car at Whiteford turn. Salo was able to restart his car and continue in sixth.

Michael Schumacher led the final 39 laps to take the 54th victory of his career. Montoya was 18.628 seconds behind in second position. He was a further 6.4 seconds ahead of Räikkönen, who took the first podium finish of his career in third. Irvine and Webber finished fourth and fifth after starting from 19th and 18th respectively. Salo took the final point in sixth place, the first time a team scored points in its debut race since JJ Lehto finished fifth for Sauber at the 1993 South African Grand Prix. Yoong came seventh with a "long" brake pedal and a car optimised for wet-weather; marshals mistakenly waved blue flags at Yoong because they did not know which lap he was on. De la Rosa was the final classified finisher after a misfiring engine required him to undergo a lengthy pit stop. The attrition rate was high, with eight of the twenty-two starters finishing the race.

Post-race
The top three drivers appeared on the podium to collect their trophies and spoke to the media in a later press conference. Michael Schumacher called his battle with Montoya "an interesting one" and "a bit back and forward", adding "I think as well that the tyres played a little bit of a role in that; initially I struggled to get the temperature in where these guys seemed to get faster on top of temperatures but then it went the other way around, their tyres went off and my one came in so I had a nice chance to battle a little bit and finally got first position for us, which was ideal." Montoya said he enjoyed the battle and stated Ferrari had the fastest car, "I think the conditions were not the best for the tyres. Hopefully in Malaysia it is going to be hotter, it could play into our hands a little bit." Räikkönen said he was surprised to finish third and talked about the ease of overtaking other cars, "Some cars was more difficult and then it was helping me a lot big time because the safety car came out second time and I got behind the leaders and that was the main reason that I catch them, but it was quite a difficult and interesting race."

Ron Walker, the chairman of the Australian Grand Prix Corporation, persuaded Webber and Stoddart to celebrate their fifth-place result with an impromptu ceremony on the podium, which led to a fine of £50,000 from the FIA president Max Mosley. In a retrospective interview for The Weekend Australian in 2012, Stoddart called Webber's fifth-place finish "the most exciting two points in the history of Formula One". Webber commented on the result, "Finishing the race fifth was unbelievable. We had people scaling catch fencing. Occupational health and safety would have gone ballistic these days. It was a unique day." The result saw Webber's three-race contract with Minardi extended to the end of the season. The media compared Webber's achievement to the ice skater Steven Bradbury winning a gold medal in the men's 1000 metres short track speed skating at the 2002 Winter Olympics; both men were successful after several participants crashed in their respective events.

Following their collision, their third in the past two seasons, Barrichello and Ralf Schumacher were summoned to meet the stewards, who reviewed television footage post-race. Neither driver received a penalty and were given a warning. The stewards classed the crash as "a racing incident", with neither competitor to blame. Michael Schumacher argued Barrichello braked earlier than normal, saying "I was afraid to turn into the first corner because I suddenly saw cars flying next to me. I decided to go straight on and have a nice ride through the grass, which was a good decision, otherwise I guess I would have been hit." Barrichello said he was not to blame for the accident, "If he wanted to overtake on the outside, he should have moved a lot further. I didn't get in his way." Jackie Stewart, the three-time world champion, argued Ralf Schumacher had misjudged the braking distance for turn one, while Coulthard believed Barrichello caused the accident by braking earlier than usual.

Whiting's decision not to stop the race after the eight-car crash was criticised. The technical director of the Jordan team Gary Anderson called it "the most absurd thing I've seen in my life". Fisichella believing not stopping the race  was "ridiculous", and Michael Schumacher agreed it should have been stopped. Coulthard defended the decision, saying "I've always felt that to deprive the spectators of a number of cars as a result of an incident at the first corner isn't really good for the business. But this isn't Hollywood. You don't cut out the bits you don't like. This is real. This is racing." Ralf Schumacher also backed Whiting's ruling, noting "Charlie Whiting took the right decision by not stopping the race. He had made it quite clear to us that he would not stop a race unless it was for safety reasons and that wasn't the case."

Because this was the first race of the season, Michael Schumacher led the World Drivers' Championship with ten points. Montoya was second with six points and Räikkönen was third with four. Irvine was fourth with three points and Webber was fifth with two points. Ferrari took the lead of the World Constructors' Championship with ten points. Williams were second with six points and McLaren followed in third with four points. With three points, Jaguar were fourth and Minardi fifth with two points with sixteen races left in the season.

Race classification
Drivers who scored championship points are denoted in bold.

Notes
  – Heinz-Harald Frentzen and Enrique Bernoldi were disqualified for passing the red light at the exit of the pit lane and changing to the team's spare car after the commencement of the formation lap, respectively.

Championship standings after the race

Drivers' Championship standings

Constructors' Championship standings

Note: Only the top five positions are included for both sets of standings.

References

Grand Prix
Australian Grand Prix
Australian Grand Prix
Australian Grand Prix